Confort-Meilars is a commune in the Finistère department of Brittany in north-western France.

See also
Communes of the Finistère department
Yann Larhantec
List of the works of the Maître de Plougastel

References

External links

Official website 

Mayors of Finistère Association 

Communes of Finistère